= Nordvestinskiy =

Island in Caspian Sea, Kazakhstan

Nordvestinkiy
Native name: Нордвестинск

Geography
- Location: Caspian Sea

Administration
- Kazakhstan

Nordvestinskiy (/ˌnɔːrdˈvɛstɪnski/, Kazakh: Нордвестинск) is a coastal sandbar island in the Caspian Sea. It is administered by Kazakhstan. The island also features a lighthouse on it.
